In religion and spirituality, a pilgrimage is a long journey or search of great moral significance. Sometimes, it is a journey to a sacred place or to a shrine of importance to a person's beliefs and faith. Members of every major religion participate in pilgrimages. A person who makes such a journey is called a pilgrim.

There are number of historical Buddhist pilgrimage sites in the Republic of India.

Places associated with the life of Buddha

Primary sites

Buddhism offers four primary sites of pilgrimage: Lumbini (birthplace of the Buddha), Bodh Gaya (the site where the Buddha attained enlightenment), Sarnath (the location of the Buddha’s first sermon), and Kushinagar (the location where the Buddha attained parinirvana). All of these sites are located in India except Lumbini, which is located in southern Nepal.

Places visited by Buddha for discourse

 Andhra Pradesh: 
Nagarjunakonda in Guntur district: Seat of Mahayana
Thotlakonda and Bojjannakonda in Visakhapatnam
 Bihar: The name of Bihar is derived from vihara, meaning monastery, such was the association of the area with Buddhism. In addition to these sites which were visited by the Buddha, other sites in India have become notable:
 Patna,  — Formerly known as Pataliputra, it was the seat of the Mauryan empire and a significant Buddhist centre
 Rajgir, Bihar — Formerly known as Rajagaha, it was the capital of Magadha, ruled by King Bimbisara, one of the most prominent monarchs and supporters during the lifetime of the Buddha
 Nalanda, Bihar — Site of an ancient Buddhist university, destroyed by Bakhtiyar Khalji during Islamic attacks
 Sravasti, Uttar Pradesh — Formerly known as Savatthi, it was the capital of Kosala, ruled by King Pasenadi, one of the most prominent monarchs and supporters during the lifetime of the Buddha
 Vaishali, Bihar — Seat of a republican state of the Lichchavis, prominent supporters of the Buddha. Site of the Second Buddhist Council
 Haryana: Sacred places in the order of travel by Buddha, where he gave several important discourses documented in the Pali texts. After visiting Mathura, he travelled along Grand Trunk Road in Haryana (also see Buddhist pilgrimage sites in Haryana).
 From Mathura in Uttar Pradesh, Buddha travelled along Grand Trunk Road in Haryana (also see Buddhist pilgrimage sites in Haryana).
 Kamashpura Aastha Pugdal Pagoda (Kumashpur) in Sonipat city, the place where Buddha gave Mahasatipatthana sutta),. 
 Kurukshetra Stupa on the banks of sacred Brahma Sarovar in Kurukshetra city
 Topra between Kurukshetra and Yamunanagar, now has a large open air museum park housing several replica of Ashoka's edicts including largest Ashoka Chakra in the world
 Srughna, now known as the Sugh Ancient Mound, on outskirts of Yamunanagar city
 Chaneti Stupa, on outskirts of Yamunanagar city

Other prominent historic Buddhist sites by state

All are the historic ancient sites of learning, and the list includes very few relatively new sites which have been specifically highlighted accordingly. Most of these sites have association with Ashoka and other Buddhist kings.

Andhra Pradesh

 Amaravati
Bavikonda 
 Bojjannakonda
 Bhattiprolu
 Chandavaram
Dharanikota
 Ghantasala
Gudivada
 Guntupalli
Jaggayyapeta
Nagarjunakonda
 Pavurallakonda museum
 Ramatheertham
 Salihundam
 Thotlakonda
Undavalli Caves
 Visakhapatnam

Assam

 Namphake in Dibrugarh
 Surya Pahar in Goalpara
 Hayagriva Madhava at Hajo

Bihar

 Kesaria stupa
 Krimila
 Nalanda
 Odantapuri
 Saptaparni Cave
 Sujata Stupa
 Vaishali
 Vikramshila
 Vulture Peak

Goa

 Lamgao caves
 Rivona caves

Gujarat

 Vadnagar in Mehsana district

Haryana

In 2021, it was announced that Buddha Haryana circuit will be developed by the Centre for yatra (pilgrimage).

Also see above the "places visited by Buddha for discourse" which has additional sites in Haryana.
 Adi Badri, Haryana
 Mounds: Agroha Mound, Sugh Ancient Mound
 Pillars of Ashoka: (Hisar, Fatehabad Ashokan Pillar, Topra Kalan Edicts Museum)

Jammu and Kashmir

 Harwan, near Mughal Shalimar Garden, dating from the fifth century 
 Parihaspore, 20 km northeast of Srinagar 
 Panderathan, near Srinagar

Madhya Pradesh

 Bagh Caves
 Sanchi, site of a large stupa built by Ashoka which also houses the relics of Sariputra and Mahamoggallana, the two chief disciples of the Buddha; reputedly the place from which Mahinda set out to proselytise Sri Lanka.

Maharashtra

 Ajanta, site of intricate Buddhist cave paintings depicting Buddhism
 karla caves site of intricate Buddhist cave paintings
 Ellora, site of intricate Buddhist cave paintings
 Deekshabhoomi, a new 20th century site associated with Dr. Bhimrao  Ambedkar

Odisha

 Lalitgiri
 Ratnagiri
 Udayagiri

Telangana

 Nelakondapalli, 
 Phanigiri

Tripura

 Pilak, an archaeological site in the Santirbazar sub-division of South Tripura district

Uttar Pradesh

 Kosambi
 Mathura
 Pāvā (Fazilnagar)
 Piprahwa

Tibetan Buddhist sites

By state

 Arunachal Pradesh: Tawang
 Sikkim: Dubdi Monastery, Enchey Monastery, Pemayangtse Monastery, Ralang Monastery, Rumtek, Tashiding Monastery, Tawang Monastery, Zang Dhok Palri Phodang
 Himachal Pradesh: 
 Dharamsala, 
 McLeod Ganj at Dharamsala, the primary seat of current Dalai Lama
 Palpung Sherabling Monastery at Baijnath
 Tabo Monastery, Spiti Valley, Himachal Pradesh
 Karnataka: Namdroling Monastery in Bylakuppe near Mysore
 Ladakh: Leh

Sikkim

 Dubdi Monastery, occasionally called 'Yuksom Monastery' is a Buddhist monastery of the Nyingma sect of Tibetan Buddhism near Yuksom, in the Geyzing subdivision of West Sikkim district.
 Enchey Monastery is located in Gangtok, the capital city of Sikkim in the Northeastern Indian state. It belongs to the Nyingma order of Vajrayana Buddhism.
 Ralang Monastery is a Buddhist monastery of the Kagyu sect of Tibetan Buddhism in southern Sikkim, northeastern India. It is located six kilometres from Ravangla.
 Rumtek Monastery also called the "Dharmachakra Centre", is a gompa located in the Indian state of Sikkim near the capital Gangtok. It is a focal point for the sectarian tensions within the Karma Kagyu school of Tibetan Buddhism that characterize the Karmapa controversy.
 Tashiding Monastery is a Buddhist monastery of the Nyingma sect of Tibetan Buddhism in Western Sikkim, northeastern India. It is located on top of the hill rising between the Rathong chu and the Rangeet River.
 Tawang Monastery in the Indian state of Arunachal Pradesh is the largest monastery in India and second largest in the world after the Potala Palace in Lhasa, Tibet.
 Zang Dhok Palri Phodang is a Buddhist monastery in Kalimpong in West Bengal, India. The monastery is located atop Durpin Hill, one of the two hills of the town. It was consecrated in 1976 by the visiting Dalai Lama.

See also

 Buddhist pilgrimage
 Buddhist pilgrimage sites in Nepal
 Shikoku Pilgrimage, Eighty-eight Temples pilgrimage in the Shikoku island, Japan
 Japan 100 Kannon Pilgrimage, pilgrimage circuit that is composed of three independent pilgrimages (Saigoku, Bandō and Chichibu) in Japan

References

External links
Web
 Buddhist pilgrimage sites in India
 Pilgrims Guide to Buddhist India: Buddhist Sites

Videos
Youtube: Lord Buddha & Buddhist Pilgrimage Sites in India —A Documentary in Hindi

 
Pilgrimages
Pilgrimages
Pilgrimage in India
Lists of pilgrimage sites in India
India religion-related lists